Aurélie Amblard is a French actress, who works both in France and in the UK.
Straight after her master's degree in performing arts, she decided to create her own theatre  company in the South of France, and soon started a career in film and television. She moved to Paris then London, where she is now based, and comes back to her first love, theatre, with "La Ronde", after having appeared in several short films and documentaries. She was present at the Whitechapel Gallery for the premiere of film "Programme", by the director Richard Squires, in February 2007.

Filmography

Cinema

Television

Music Video

External links
 
 Official site
 CV  The Spotlight
 Interview Une femme d'honneur

Living people
French film actresses
French television actresses
French stage actresses
21st-century French actresses
French expatriates in England
Year of birth missing (living people)